The 2020 Northwest Territories Men's Curling Championship was held from January 30 to February 2 at the Hay River Curling Club in Hay River. The winning Jamie Koe rink represented the Northwest Territories at the 2020 Tim Hortons Brier in Kingston, Ontario and finished with a 2–5 record.

Five teams entered the event, and played a round robin tournament with a three team playoff. Jamie Koe won his fourteenth Northwest Territories Men's Curling Championship when he defeated Glen Hudy 11–5 in the final.

Teams
The teams are listed as follows:

Round-robin standings
Final round-robin standings

Round-robin results
All draws are listed in Eastern Time (UTC−05:00).

Draw 1
Thursday, January 30, 5:30 pm

Draw 2
Thursday, January 30, 10:00 pm

Draw 3
Friday, January 31, 12:00 pm

Draw 4
Friday, January 31, 5:00 pm

Draw 5
Saturday, February 1, 11:00 am

Playoffs

Semifinal
Saturday, February 1, 9:30 pm

Final
Sunday, February 2, 1:00 pm

References

2020 Tim Hortons Brier
Curling in the Northwest Territories
2020 in the Northwest Territories
Northwest Territories Men's Curling Championship
Northwest Territories Men's Curling Championship
South Slave Region